The Kurds in Kazakhstan,, form a part of the historically significant Kurdish population in the post-Soviet space, and encompass people born in or residing in Kazakhstan who are of Kurdish origin. According to the most recent Kazakh census in 2011, the Kurdish population is 38,325 or 0.2% of the population, but Vice President of the Kurdish Association of Kazakhstan, Malikshah Gasanov numbers the population up to 46,000, because many Kurds list themselves as Turks and Azeris. Other sources predict this number to be higher, counting up to 60,000 Kurds in Kazakhstan. During the Soviet era, most of the Kurdish population in the Kazakh SSR were deported there by Joseph Stalin from the Armenian, Azerbaijan and Georgian Soviet republics. Years later, Kurds immigrated to Kazakhstan from the neighbouring countries, Uzbekistan and Kyrgyzstan.

In cities with a substantial Kurdish population, Kurdish literature and Kurdish language is taught in the primary and secondary schools. In the village of Kashkabulak, Kurdish students can study Kurdish through 12th grade. And since 1990, Kurds also have had their own newspaper, the Kurdistan newspaper.

Deportation and immigration
Kurds were deported twice to Central Asia from Caucasia. The first deportation occurred in 1937 where Stalin deported Kurds from Nakhchivan and the second deportation occurred in 1944 in Georgia. Stalin feared a Turkish invasion and he saw Kurds as unreliable, even though many Kurds served in the Soviet military. Many of them died during the deportations.

After the Osh riots and the riots in Fergana Valley between Kyrgyzs and Uzbeks, many Kurds moved to Kazakhstan.

Population by year
Number of Kurds in Kazakhstan per official statistics:

See also
Nadir Nadirov
Kurdish population

References

Ethnic groups in Kazakhstan
Kurdish diaspora